Wolfen is a 1981 American crime horror film directed by Michael Wadleigh, based on Whitley Strieber's 1978 novel The Wolfen. It stars Albert Finney, Diane Venora, Gregory Hines and Edward James Olmos. The film follows a city cop who has been assigned to uncover what is behind a series of vicious murders. Originally, it is believed the murders are animal attacks until the cop discovers an indigenous legend about wolf spirits.

Plot
Former NYPD Captain Dewey Wilson is brought back to the force and assigned to solve a bizarre string of violent murders after high-profile magnate Christopher Van der Veer, his wife, and his bodyguard are slain in Battery Park. Executive Security, the private firm employed by Van der Veer, blames the murders on terrorists, but knowing that the victim's bodyguard was a 300-pound Haitian with voodoo ties makes Wilson skeptical. With pressure to solve the case coming from both the Police Commissioner and the Mayor, Wilson is partnered with criminal psychologist Rebecca Neff.

Elsewhere, in the South Bronx, a homeless man explores an abandoned church that is scheduled to be demolished by Van der Veer's development company. He is killed by an unseen monstrous being. Wilson and Neff investigate his murder. At the church, the apparent sounds of a baby crying lure Neff up to the bell tower. Wilson follows her, but does not hear the crying; once Neff is separated from him, he hears a wolf howl. He goes up after Neff and drags her to safety. Later that night, a bridge worker is apparently murdered by the same creature.

Coroner Whittington discovers non-human hairs on several victims and consults a zoologist named Ferguson, who identifies the hairs as belonging to an unknown subspecies of Canis lupus. Ferguson compares wolves to Native Americans. Inspired, Wilson finds Eddie Holt, a militant Native activist he arrested some years previously, working in construction. While Wilson interrogates Holt on top of the Manhattan Bridge, Holt claims to be a shapeshifter, which implicates him as the killer. Wilson opts to leave Holt alone and tail him that night.

Following animal clues, Ferguson goes to Central Park, where the killer ambushes him in a tunnel. Wilson spends the remainder of his night with Neff where they have sex. The following morning, a man in a jogging suit rides Ferguson's motorcycle past Wilson as he leaves Neff's apartment. Whittington and Wilson stake out the church, armed with sniper rifles and sound equipment; after Whittington almost blows his ears out by opening a beer can near a parabolic microphone, an animal that appears to be a wolf kills him. Meanwhile, Executive Security apprehends a "Götterdämmerung" terrorist cell in connection with the Van der Veer slaying.

A traumatized Wilson escapes the church and finds himself at the nearby Wigwam Bar, where Holt and his friends are drinking. The group of Natives reveals the true nature of the killer as "Wolfen", the wolf spirit. They explain that the Wolfen have extraordinary abilities and "might be gods". Holt tells Wilson that he cannot fight the Wolfen, stating: "You don't have the eyes of the hunter, you have the eyes of the dead". The leader of the group, the Old Indian, informs Wilson that the Wolfen kill to protect their hunting ground. Wilson resolves to end his involvement in the Van der Veer case but he, Neff, and Wilson's superior, Warren, are cornered on Wall Street by the Wolfen pack. Warren is decapitated while Wilson and Neff flee.

Wilson and Neff are cornered in Van der Veer's penthouse by the pack, led by its white alpha male. Wilson smashes the model of the construction project that threatened their hunting ground, trying to communicate that the threat no longer exists and that he and Neff are not enemies. The Wolfen vanish just as the police barge in. Wilson claims the attack was made by terrorists. In a voiceover, Wilson explains that Wolfen will continue preying on weak and isolated members of the human herd as humans do to each other through class conflict. Wolfen will continue being invisible to humanity because of their nature; not that of spirits but predators, who are higher on the food chain than humans. The last scene is Eddie and his friends looking at the city from the bridge.

Cast
 Albert Finney as Detective Dewey Wilson
 Diane Venora as Detective Rebecca Neff
 Edward James Olmos as Eddie Holt
 Gregory Hines as Coroner Whittington
 Tom Noonan as Ferguson
 Dick O'Neill as Captain Warren
 Dehl Berti as Old Indian
 Peter Michael Goetz as Ross
 Reginald VelJohnson as Morgue Attendant
 James Tolkan as "Baldy", The Medical Examiner
 Donald Symington as Lawyer
 Roy Brocksmith as Fat Jogger In Park
 Tom Waits as Drunken Bar Owner (uncredited)

Production
The film is known for its early use of an in-camera effect to portray the subjective point of view of a wolf. Similar to thermography, the technique was later adopted by other horror films such as the Predator film series. The setting for the transient home of the wolves was shot in the South Bronx (intersection of Louis Niñé Boulevard and Boston Road).

The church seen in the opening panorama shot was located at the intersection of E 172nd Street and Seabury Place. The shot of this neighborhood is from the north looking roughly south-south-east. The decrepit site of ruined buildings was no special effect; the church was built and burned exclusively for the film. Urban decay in the South Bronx in the early 1980s was so widespread that it was the ideal production setting.

Dustin Hoffman was interested in portraying the role of Dewey Wilson but Wadleigh insisted on Albert Finney. According to Roger Ebert, the film was originally to have been distributed by United Artists. With claims of being overbudget and being over schedule, Orion Pictures tried to have Wadleigh fired. A contentious dispute led to Wadleigh being allowed to shoot what he needed before being let go while retaining director credit, while John D. Hancock would be brought in to supervise the ADR sessions after the film got cut down to an acceptable length by Richard Chew, who was not credited for his work.

Release
Wolfen was released theatrically in the United States by Orion Pictures through Warner Bros. on July 24, 1981. The film grossed only $10,626,725 at the box office. It was released just a few months after another werewolf feature in The Howling, and An American Werewolf in London would be released less than a month after Wolfen; both of those films managed to outperform this film at the box office.

Home media
Wolfen was released on DVD by Warner Home Video on August 13, 2002. Warner Home Video would later re-release the film in 2004 and 2007, with the latter release being a part of its two-disk "Horror: 4 Film Favorites" pack. On June 2, 2015, it was released for the first time on Blu-ray by Warner Archive Collection.

Reception and legacy
On the review aggregator website Rotten Tomatoes, Wolfen holds a 76% approval rating based on 25 critic reviews, with an average rating of 6.2/10. The consensus reads: “Police procedural meets werewolf flick in Wolfen, a creepy creature feature with a surprisingly profound side.” On Metacritic, the film has a weighted average score of 64 out of 100, based on 8 critics, indicating "generally positive reviews".

Roger Ebert gave the film three and a half out of a possible four stars, calling it, "an uncommonly intelligent treatment of a theme that is usually just exploited." There was some disagreement if Wolfen is about werewolves. Time Out called it a "werewolf movie," but Roger Ebert asserted Wolfen "is not about werewolves but is about the possibility that Indians and wolves can exchange souls."

It was nominated for Four Saturn Awards including Best Horror Film, Best Director for Wadleigh and Best Actor for Finney.

A poster for the film can be seen in an alleyway in the film Joker toward the film's conclusion.

References

External links
 
 
 
 
 

1981 films
1981 horror films
American supernatural horror films
Films scored by James Horner
Films set in the Bronx
Films set in New York City
Films shot in New York City
Films based on American horror novels
American werewolf films
Orion Pictures films
Warner Bros. films
Films based on works by Whitley Strieber
Films directed by Michael Wadleigh
1980s English-language films
1980s American films
Films about Native Americans